Robert Giblin (born November 18, 1952) is a former American football defensive back. He played for the New York Giants in 1975 and for the St. Louis Cardinals in 1977.

References

1952 births
Living people
American football defensive backs
Houston Cougars football players
New York Giants players
St. Louis Cardinals (football) players